Koray Aldemir (born 1990) is a German poker player of Turkish descent, born in Berlin and now residing in Vienna, Austria. In 2021, he won the World Series of Poker Main Event for $8,000,000.

Aldemir first played poker while at a friend's house on New Year's Eve in 2006. He began by playing freerolls on PokerStars and had his first recorded live cash in January 2012 in a €200 tournament held in Berlin. While playing a tournament in Rozvadov, Czech Republic in 2013, Aldemir allowed another player to use his computer to send money on PokerStars and had his account locked on the site for the next four years. He moved to Vienna soon after to study psychology in university.

Prior to the Main Event, Aldemir's best career cash was for $2.1 million when he finished in third place in the $111,111 One Drop High Roller at the 2016 World Series of Poker. That same year, he finished runner-up to Adrian Mateos in the Summer Solstice event.

Aldemir won a Triton high roller in the Philippines in 2017 for $1.3 million. In 2018, he finished third in the PokerStars Caribbean Adventure for $481,000. He also won an event at the 2019 U.S. Poker Open.

At the 2021 Main Event, Aldemir began the final table with the chip lead and went heads-up against George Holmes. The victory moved him past $20 million in career earnings and into fourth place on Germany's all-time money list.

At the 2022 WSOP, Aldemir finished 3rd in the player of the year race, and made another deep run in the main event, finishing in 75th place out of 8,663 competitors in defense of his title. In the process, he set a record for most players outlasted in a row in main events with 15,328 between the 2021 and 2022 main events combined.

World Series of Poker bracelets

References

External links
Hendon Mob profile

1990 births
German poker players
World Series of Poker Main Event winners
World Series of Poker bracelet winners
Living people